The  is a single-tracked, 2.2 km short railway line operated by Kintetsu Railway, connecting Dōmyōji Station in the city of Fujiidera and Kashiwara Station in Kashiwara, both in Osaka Prefecture.

History
The line is the oldest in the Kintetsu railway network.

Then the railway line between Dōmyōji and Kashiwara became a short branch line of the network.

In 1943, the predecessor of Kintetsu, the  merged the company. In 1944 it renamed itself Kintetsu.

Operation
All trains are operated as locals between Dōmyōji and Kashiwara. One set of two-car EMU serves the line all day.

Stations
All stations are in Osaka Prefecture.

References

Domyoji Line
Rail transport in Osaka Prefecture
1067 mm gauge railways in Japan
Railway lines opened in 1898